Iowa Central Community College is a public community college in Fort Dodge, Iowa, with satellite campuses in Webster City and Storm Lake.

History
The college was organized in 1966 on the foundation of three area junior colleges which had been operating since the 1920s by the local public school systems. These three colleges were in Fort Dodge, organized in 1921; Webster City, 1926; and Eagle Grove, 1928. Iowa Central came into being as a result of the Area School Act passed by Iowa's 61st General Assembly. The legislation authorized two or more county school systems to merge to form an area community college. Nine counties combined to create Iowa Central: Buena Vista, Calhoun, Greene, Hamilton, Humboldt, Pocahontas, Sac, Webster and Wright. The resulting Merged Area V has some 28,000 students in 31 public school districts. In 1971, a fourth center was added with the completion of a new building in Storm Lake. The Storm Lake Center originally was established to serve 12 public and private school systems in Buena Vista County as a secondary career education center. In the ensuing years, the Storm Lake Center has been expanded so that now it offers the full range of community college programs.

In 1975, Iowa Central joined with Buena Vista College in Storm Lake in a cooperative venture whereby students can earn a bachelor's degree attending evening classes. The students' first two years are completed at Iowa Central and the final two years at Buena Vista at the Fort Dodge Center.

Academics

Iowa Central Community College students can obtain two year degrees in various fields. For an Associate of Arts degree, there are more than 50 majors the school offers including accounting, journalism, and social work. For an Associate of Applied Science, there are over 30 majors students can choose from such as diesel technology, fire science, and television and radio production. Iowa Central also offers other diploma programs including carpentry, culinary arts, industrial mechanics, and more.

Athletics

The Tritons have a long history of being successful in athletics. Iowa Central boasts 40 national championships across the different sports in which they compete.

Notable alumni
Tyji Armstrong, professional football player
Daryl Beall, Iowa Senator 
Adva Cohen (born 1996), Israeli runner
Colby Covington, professional mixed martial artist
Cyrus Fees, professional mixed martial artist and professional wrestling TV announcer
Jon "Bones" Jones, college wrestler and professional mixed martial artist, Current Undisputed UFC Heavyweight Champion. Former UFC Light Heavyweight Champion
Stanley Kebenei, distance runner
John Matuszak, professional football player
Drew McFedries, retired professional mixed martial artist
Terell Parks (born 1991), professional basketball player
Maddie Poppe, vocalist and American Idol winner
Joe Soto, college wrestler and mixed martial artist
Pita Gus Sowakula, professional rugby union player
Amari Spievey, professional football player
Troy Stedman, professional football player
Cain Velasquez, college wrestler and professional mixed martial artist

References

External links
 Official website

Education in Webster County, Iowa
Education in Hamilton County, Iowa
Education in Buena Vista County, Iowa
Fort Dodge, Iowa
Community colleges in Iowa
NJCAA athletics